Pseudolithos cubiformis is a species of succulent plant native to Somalia. While its genus name, Pseudolithos, refers to its stone-like appearance, the species is especially named for its squat, leafless, and often cube-shaped growth habit.

References

Flora of Somalia
cubiformis
Plants described in 1959